Lorraine Bruce is a British television, film and stage actress, best known for her portrayal of Denise Simpson in the Kay Mellor five part BBC One series The Syndicate In 2013, she was cast in Lucky 7, the U.S. version of The Syndicate. Bruce trained at The Academy of Live and Recorded Arts.

Filmography

Television

Film

Theatre
 Piaf, as Toine; Donmar Warehouse/West End transfer
 Les Miserables,  as Madame Thenardier; West End
 Vernon God Little,  as End Pam/Judge/Other Roles; Young Vic
 That Day We Sang,  as Dorothy/Pauline; Manchester International Festival
 The Rise and Fall Of Little Voice,  as Sadie Mae
 Teechers,  as Hobby
 Romeo & Juliet, as Nurse; Hull Truck
 Saucy Jack & The Space Vixens, as Chesty Prospects; London Cast
 Mail Order Bride,  as June
 Get Ken Barlow, as Leslie
 Scuffer, as Cathy; West Yorkshire Playhouse

References

External links
 

British television actresses
Actresses from Warrington
Living people
Alumni of the Academy of Live and Recorded Arts
Year of birth missing (living people)